The Progress D-18T (or Lotarev D-18T) is a  high-bypass turbofan that powers the Antonov An-124 Ruslan and An-225 large freighters.

Design and development

The engine was developed in the second half of the 1970s by the then Soviet Ivchenko-Progress design bureau. It is manufactured by the Motor Sich factory in Zaporizhzhia, Ukraine. It was the first engine in the USSR that could deliver more than 20,000 kgf (~196 kN or ~44,000 lbf) of thrust.
The first start of a full-scale engine occurred on September 19, 1980, the An-124 maiden flight on December 24, 1982 and the engine passed official bench tests on December 19, 1985.

An upgraded 3M version was developed to reduce emissions and increase the life of the hot section to 14,000 h, and is introduced on An-124s of Antonov Airlines.
Currently 188 D-18T engines are in operation with a total flight time of over 1 million hours.

Incidents 

In March 2020 Ukrainian authorities ordered a one time inspection of all D-18T engine intermediate pressure compressor disks following an uncontained engine failure.  Inspections were required to be carried out within six months.  On 13 November 2020 a Volga-Dnepr Airlines An-124 had an uncontained failure of the inboard left (number 2) D-18T engine.

Applications

 Antonov An-124 
 Antonov An-225 (destroyed 2022)

Specifications (D-18T)

See also

References

External links 

 D-18T Series 3 Turbofan Aero Engine - SE Ivchenko-Progress
 

Ivchenko-Progress aircraft engines
High-bypass turbofan engines
1980s turbofan engines
Three-spool turbofan engines